Gorham's Rangers was one of the most famous and effective ranger units raised in colonial North America. Formed by John Gorham, the unit served as the prototype for many subsequent ranger forces, including the better known Rogers' Rangers. The unit started out as a Massachusetts provincial auxiliary company, which means it was not part of the province's normal militia system. Recruited in the summer of 1744 at the start of King George's War, Governor William Shirley ordered the unit raised as reinforcements for the then-besieged British garrison at Fort Anne in Annapolis Royal. The unit was primarily used to secure British control in Nova Scotia, whose population consisted primarily of hostile Acadian and Mi'kmaq. Initially a sixty-man all-Indian company led by British officers, the original Native American members of the unit were gradually replaced by Anglo-Americans and recent Scots and Irish immigrants and were a minority in the unit by the mid-1750s. The company were reconnaissance experts as well as renowned for their expertise at both water-borne operations and frontier guerrilla warfare. They were known for surprise amphibious raids on Acadian and Mi'kmaq coastal or riverine settlements, using large whaleboats, which carried between ten and fifteen rangers each. This small unit was the main British military force defending Nova Scotia from 1744 to 1749. The company became part of the British Army and was expanded during the Seven Years' War and went on to play an important role in fighting in Nova Scotia as well as participating in many of the important campaigns of the war, particularly distinguishing itself at the Siege of Quebec in 1759.

King George's War 

Gorham's Rangers was a Massachusetts provincial auxiliary company of New England Indians (mainly Wampanoag and Nauset, but also a few Pigwacket) led by Anglo-American officers and commanded by Captain John Gorham. The company was recruited in the late-spring / early summer of 1744 after Nova Scotia Lieutenant-Governor Paul Mascarene wrote to Massachusetts governor William Shirley requesting military aid. The force was sent to the relief of Annapolis Royal. They were accompanied by several regular provincial Infantry companies and arrived in Nova Scotia in September 1744. Their presence helped lift the siege of the beleaguered Fort Anne by Acadian and Mi'kmaq forces. The Indian members of the company were offered bounties for Mi'kmaq scalps and prisoners as part of their pay, and in December they pressured Gorham to return to New England to claim the bounty money for the scalps and prisoners they had taken. While in New England in February 1745, Gorham was commissioned a lieutenant colonel and given second-in-command of his father's regiment, the 7th Massachusetts Infantry, which took part in the Siege of Louisburg in the late spring and early summer of 1745. The rangers apparently stayed behind in the Annapolis Basin and used Goat Island, a small islet off Annapolis Royal, as their base of operations. Mi'kmaq, Abenaki, and Huron Indians, supposedly aided by Acadian raiders, surprised the garrison on the island in May 1745. In the raid they captured nine Indian rangers and the Anglo-American crew members of two supply schooners moored at the island and took the prisoners to Quebec. Some were imprisoned in the city while others were forcibly adopted into various Indian villages around Quebec. A few were later released, at least one was exchanged for a French prisoner, while two chose to remain in the Abenaki communities they were now a part of. Gorham stayed in Louisburg through the spring of 1746 before returning to Annapolis and leading the rangers in a series of small expeditions against the Mi'kmaq and skirmishes with Acadians over the next several years. By the end of this period the unit was a fraction of its former size. Though accidents, disease, casualties, and captivity, only about a third of the original recruits remained. The next year, in 1747, Gorham traveled to England for an audience with King George II, who granted him a commission and approved the expansion of the unit, now part of the British Army, and tasked it with protecting British interests in Nova Scotia. Between 1747 and 1749, with the support of two armed sloops provided by Gorham himself, this company was largely responsible for the defense of British possessions in Nova Scotia, and counter-insurgency campaigns against the Acadians and their Indian allies.

Father Le Loutre's War 
At the outbreak of Father Le Loutre's War, Gorham's Rangers was the main force utilized to suppress this rebellion. Not merely a combat unit, both John and Joseph Gorham, as well as their Pigwacket adjutant Captain Sam (see personnel list below), took part in high-level diplomatic negotiations with Le Loutre, various Mi'kmaq chiefs, and Acadian leaders who were hostile to the British. After the new Royal governor arrived, Edward Cornwallis, he established a new capital for Nova Scotia at what became Halifax. It is at this point that Gorham's unit moved its base of operations from Annapolis Royal to the new headquarters. Further, the company was involved in the establishment of Fort Sackville (Nova Scotia) and Fort Edward (Nova Scotia). After John Gorham's death in 1751, command of the unit went to his brother, Lieutenant Joseph Gorham.

In 1750, at least six independent companies of rangers were organized in Nova Scotia, all modeled on Gorham's Rangers, although they contained mainly Anglo-Americans recruited in New England. The rangers at this point were described wearing coats of blue broadcloth. However, in 1755 a French intelligence report described Gorham's company as wearing "grey, cross pocket, with small leather caps or hats. In fact, the company had very different uniforms depending on the time period in question. For more on the uniforms worn and equipment used by the company throughout its nineteen-year history, click here . No contemporary images of Gorham's Rangers are known to exist.

French and Indian War 
During the Seven Years' War, now led by Joseph Gorham, the company not only played an important role in fighting in Nova Scotia, but it also participated in many of the important campaigns of the war. Throughout 1755 to 1760, when not assigned elsewhere, they were central players in Britain's efforts to quell a low-level insurgency in Nova Scotia, fought by the Mi'kmaq Indians as well as Acadians. The rangers also took an active part in the expulsion of the Acadians, the forced removal of Catholic French settlers (Acadians) from Acadia due to their refusal to swear loyalty to the Crown. Protestant settlers from New England were granted now-vacant territories in Nova Scotia after the expulsion.

They also took part in the assault of Fort Beaujesour in 1755. In 1757, at the end of July, the company scouted French-occupied Louisbourg in anticipation of Lord Loudoun's (aborted) attack on the fortress. Gorham's men dressed as Acadian fishermen and sailed a captured fishing vessel rechristened "His Majesty's Schooner Monckton" directly into the harbor at night. Eventually a French warship fired on them, but the intelligence they gathered, about the arrival of a French fleet and reinforcements, was the deciding factor in Loudoun abandoning the assault. They played an important role in the initial amphibious assault at the outset of the second siege of Louisbourg in 1758, and were vital in the petite guerre and scorched-earth operations that took place around the periphery of the siege of Quebec in 1759. In 1761, the unit was officially placed on the British army establishment. The next year they took part in the expedition to Cuba where almost half of the corps died from tropical disease. The unit was disbanded shortly after the capitulation of Havana, and the remaining rangers were drafted into depleted British regiments.

Throughout most of the Seven Years' War, Gorham's rangers were based out of Halifax, but they often operated in tandem with a sister unit, stationed at Fort Cumberland on the Isthmus of Chignecto. This sister company, modeled on Gorham's unit, was commanded by Captain Benoni Danks, and is often referred to as "Danks' Rangers." The companies were combined in 1761 into a Nova Scotia ranging corps of which Joseph Gorham was Major Commandant. Both companies numbered between ninety and one hundred men throughout the war, although Gorham's company was augmented for the siege of Quebec to 125 men. Dank's company was raised to the same size for the expedition to Havana. When combined, the ranger corps fielded 253 men for the expedition. Of those 122 (48.2%) died, including eight officers.

The corps was officially disbanded in 1763.

Unit Composition

1744-1749
Initially the rangers were a sixty-man all-Indian unit led by British colonial officers and non-commissioned officers. The unit was captained by the politically well-connected and ambitious John Gorham III (1709-1751), who, prior to leading the rangers, had been a whaling captain and merchant from Yarmouth, Massachusetts, a small coastal town on Cape Cod. While his family had historically played an important role in colonial New England's military affairs, besides basic militia training in conventional warfare, Gorham had no prior ranger training or experience at frontier warfare. Nor did the company's junior officers, most of whom were his relatives. In the early days of the company's first deployment the officers learned their trade from the many veteran Native American soldiers who made up the company's rank and file. Most of the forty-eight privates were Wampanoag and Nauset Indians from Cape Cod. Some had served in Indian ranger companies twenty years earlier during Governor Dummer's War (1722-1726), a regional conflict the colonies of Massachusetts and New Hampshire fought against the Abenaki and other members of the Wabanaki Confederacy in Maine. Most of these Indian soldiers were also indentured servants who crewed whaleboats in the region's shore whaling industry or had been crew members on early Yankee whaleships. A small contingent of six Pequawket Indians from the Saco River region of Maine also joined the company, several of whom were likewise veteran warriors. These included a man British colonists called "Captain Sam" (probably the Pequawket sachem mentioned in French records as Jérôme Atecuando). Captain Sam served as the company's primary guide, translator and negotiator.

After three years in the field, the company was much reduced, with Gorham himself noting that almost three quarters of the original Indian members had been killed, captured, or died from disease. Almost moribund, the company was down to just twenty-one men by mid-1747. However, later that year Gorham traveled to England and convinced his superiors there that the company should be adopted into the British army. This new-found support allowed for the company to be expanded and new recruits added, bringing it back up to full strength. A muster roll from February 1748 shows a revived company of sixty-five rangers, with Native Americans, still the preferred recruits, making up almost two thirds of the complement.

1749-1756
Gorham's Rangers was much expanded during these years, with the company increasing in size to a peak of 114 men by the summer of 1749, and averaging between 90 and 95 men through the mid-1750s. Native American men continued to serve in the unit, but during this period recruits were increasingly Anglo-Americans. A partial muster roll from January 1750, showing about half of the unit that was sent on a mission to capture Acadians at Minas, reveals that Native Americans were less than one third of the detachment. By 1749-50, John Gorham, deeply in debt from using his own money to fund the company, was forced to travel to England to seek reimbursement. While pleading his case in London he contracted smallpox and died in December 1751. Joseph Gorham, now appointed commander, clearly preferred Indian soldiers to Anglo-American or British recruits as he tried to reverse the trend towards Anglicization by exchanging white rangers from the company for Indian soldiers serving in various companies of the two New England battalions sent to Nova Scotia in the spring of 1755 (which contained approximately eighty native men). At least thirteen Indians were transferred into Gorham's Rangers from just three companies in the first battalion, commanded by Lt. Col. John Winslow. Possibly more were transferred over from the second battalion, led by Lt. Col. George Scott.

1756-1762
By the mid-1750s, most of the original Indian members of Gorham's Rangers had long since been killed in combat, deserted, been captured, died from disease, or had chosen not to reenlist. While Indians from southern New England continued to be recruited for the company as late as 1761, and they remained a core element of the unit, most new members of the company in the Seven Years' War were Anglo-Americans or recent Scots or Irish immigrants to America. The company continued to average between 90 and 95 men in size, but was augmented to 125 (possibly as high as 150) for the Siege of Quebec. However, casualty rates were high for the unit at Quebec as near constant skirmishing around the edges of the encampments with Canadian militia and French-allied Indians from May through September winnowed the unit down significantly. There were as few as sixty rangers fit for duty in the company by September. Men from other ranger companies (from Roger's Ranger corps) as well as provincial troops were transferred into the unit to augment its numbers—further increasing the percentage of Anglo-Americans and Europeans in the company. And yet while Indians gradually dwindled to a small minority within the company, the unit nevertheless continued to utilize the same tactics pioneered by the original Wampanaog, Nauset and Pequawket members in the 1740s, which were taught by the Gorhams to other Anglo-American and British commanders as well as rank and file troops. Dank's Rangers likewise contained some New England Indians, but nowhere near as many as served in Gorham's company. Perhaps no more than a half dozen or so total served in Dank's unit.

Recent Scholarship
Scholarship on Gorham's Rangers frequently perpetuates a long-standing myth that the company was initially made up of Mohawks from New York or Métis from Canada. Recent scholarship disproves this and found that after reviewing surviving muster rolls and other documents relating to the company, not a single Iroquois can be documented as having served in the company. Indeed, the Indians listed as serving in the unit, aside from the few Pequawket members who were from Maine, were clearly Wampanoag and Nauset Indians from Cape Cod. This can be corroborated by comparing the men's names with census records kept by missionary societies, and deeds, probates, and vital records from Barnstable County in the 18th century, as well as from John Gorham's own writings. These records reveal most of these men hailed from the Indian communities at Mashpee, Herring Pond, Yarmouth and elsewhere on the Cape, in addition to Aquinnah on Martha's Vineyard, as well as a few other nearby southeastern New England Indian communities (Natick, Mashantucket, Mohegan, Niantic, etc.)

Notable Members 
[Note: This is not a complete listing of members of the company]

Colonial Englishmen & Other Europeans:

Officers
 Captain John Gorham (lieut.-colonel in Mass. provincial forces)
 Major Joseph Gorham
 Captain-Lieutenant Edward Watmough (lieut. 1750, capt.-lieut. 1759-1762) from England
 Lieutenant William Bourne (cousin of Gorhams, lieut. 1747-ca. 1751)
 Lieutenant John Phillips (surgeon 1750-1756)
 Lieutenant James Bean (of York, Maine, expert in Wabanaki languages, 1757-1761)
 Lieutenant William Shipton (1758-1762) [Died Havana, 1762]
 Lieutenant Elisha Waterman (1758-1762) [Died Havana, 1762]
 Lieutenant Christopher Gorham (son of John Gorham, 1761-1762) [Died Havana, 1762]
 Lieutenant Edward Crosby (1762)
 Lieutenant James Johnston (promoted from Sgt. Major, Havana, 1762)
 Lieutenant Joseph Heyland (promoted from H.M.S. Namur, Havana, 1762)
 2nd Lieutenant William Howe (1759-1762) [Died Havana, 1762]
 Ensign Matthew Wilmett [Wilmott?] (1747-1748)
 Ensign Thomas Moncrieff (Irish officer, 1749–50, later Major, 1775)
 Doctor Abraham Dupee (surgeon ca. 1759-1762) [Died Havana, 1762]
 John Gorham IV (son of John Gorham, company clerk in 1749-50)

Non-Commissioned Officers
 Sergeant Thomas Bray (1746)
 Sergeant Ebenezer Hawes (1746)
 Sergeant Philip Richardson (1748)
 Sergeant John Berry (1748)
 Sergeant John Dunn (1748)
 Sergeant James Spranger [Springer?] (1748)
 Sergeant Jonathan Clarke (1757-led detachment of six rangers)
 Corporal Joshua Newcomb (1748)
 Corporal James Richardson (1748)
 Corporal Mark McGrath (1748)
 Ensign William Smith

Enlisted Men
 Drummer Lucas Dunn (1748)
 George Lewis ("boatmaster" in 1750)
 Nathaniel Freeman ("boatmaster" in 1750)
 Jonathan Stewart ("boatmaster" in 1750)
 Cornelius Cavanaugh (Irish immigrant, in rangers in 1750s)
 Patrick Henry (Irish immigrant, in rangers 1757-1761)
 John Hall (Irish immigrant, enlisted at New London, CT in 1760)
 Nevell Brand (of Yarmouth, MA, enlisted at Barnstable, MA in 1759)
 Benjamin Braggs (of Norwich, CT, enlisted at Norwich in 1759)

Native Americans

 Captain Sam [a.k.a. Jérôme Atecuando] - Pequawket sachem
 Sabbatis - Pequawket
 Keysor - Pequawket
 Corporal Jeremy Queach - Nauset
 John Simons [Simmons]- Teticut Wampanoag preacher
 Joseph Ralph - Nauset village leader
 Peter Dogamus - Nauset
 Joseph Twiney - Nauset
 Job Manasses - Nauset
 Amos Sipson - Nauset
 David Dick - Nauset
 Sam Achoho - Nauset
 James Francis - Nauset
 James Queach - Nauset
 Nehemiah [a.k.a. 'Miah'] Cowett - Nauset
 Moses George [a.k.a. Moses Ned] - Nauset
 Jacob Chammock - Herring Pond Wampanoag
 John Cowett - Herring Pond Wampanoag
 Joseph Moses - Herring Pond Wampanoag preacher

 Joseph Pepeneu - Herring Pond Wampanoag preacher
 Joseph Beachgrass - Herring Pond / Mashpee Wampanoag
 Peter Will - Mashpee Wampanoag
 Caleb Popmonet - Mashpee Wampanoag
 Caesar Barnabus - Mashpee Wampanoag
 Jon Peter [Jonathan Peters] - Masphee Wampanoag
 ---- Webquish - Mashpee Wampanoag
 James Kiah - Mashpee Wampanoag
 Daniel Atiquin - Mashpee Wampanoag
 Daniel Tacouse - Aquinnah Wampanoag
 Thomas Tockanot - Aquinnah Wampanoag
 Eliakim Nehoman - Aquinnah Wampanoag
 Isaac Peck - Wampanoag
 Peter Washanks - Wampanoag
 Abraham Speen - Natick leader
 Jonathan Babysuck - Natick
 John Womsquam - Natick
 Joshua Uncas - Mohegan
 Pharaoh Gardner - Pequot
 Sam Pharaoh - Montauk

Identified as Indian in company records from 1746-1748 but tribal/village affiliation unclear (most likely Wampanoag or Nauset):

 Jacob Cowett
 Sam Robin (of Bridgewater, MA?)
 Moses Elimas
 Robin Sturgis (of Yarmouth, MA?)
 Richard Stephen (Nauset or Mashpee?)

 Thomas George
 James Tom (Cape Cod?)
 Simon Abraham (Herring Pond or Natick?)
 David Elimas

Africans
 Limus Coffin (from Yarmouth, MA, African-born former slave of Col. Shubael Gorham, father of John and Joseph)

See also
 Danks' Rangers
 William Shirley
 Paul Mascarene
 Charles Lawrence
 Benoni Danks
 Robert Rogers
 George Scott (army officer)
 Silvanus Cobb
 Wampanoag
 Nauset
 Pequawket
 Military history of Nova Scotia
 Military history of the Mi’kmaq People
 Military history of the Acadians

References

Bibliography
 Anderson, Fred, Crucible of War: The Seven Years' War and the Fate of Empire in British North America, 1754-1766 (Vintage Books, 2001).
 Carroll, Brian D., ""Savages" in the Service of Empire: Native American Soldiers in Gorham's Rangers, 1744-1762," The New England Quarterly 85, no. 3 (Sept. 2012), pp. 383-429.
 
 Grenier, John, The Far Reaches of Empire: War in Nova Scotia, 1710-1760 (Univ. of Oklahoma Press, 2008).
 Lee, Wayne E., Empires and Indigenes: Intercultural Alliance, Imperial Expansion, and Warfare in the Early Modern World (NYU Press, 2011)
 Lee, Wayne E., "Subjects, Clients, Allies, or Mercenaries? The British use of Irish and Amerindian military power, 1500-1815," in Britain's Oceanic Empire: Atlantic and Indian Ocean Worlds, c. 1550-1850 eds. H.V. Bowen, Elizabeth Mancke, and John G. Reid (Cambridge University Press, 2012).
 Plank, Geoffrey, An Unsettled Conquest: The British Campaign Against the Peoples of Acadia (UPENN Press, 2001)

External links
 John Gorham Papers (Clements Library, University of Michigan)
 
 
 

Military history of Acadia
Military units and formations of Nova Scotia
Military history of New England
Military history of the Thirteen Colonies
Regiments of the British Army
Military units and formations of the French and Indian War
British American Army Rangers
Military units and formations established in 1744
Massachusetts militia
Militia in the United States
French and Indian War
Wars involving the states and peoples of North America
18th century in North America
Colonization history of the United States
New France
Anglo-French wars
1744 establishments in the British Empire
British Army Rangers